is a former Japanese football player.

Club statistics

References

External links

1987 births
Living people
Association football people from Ibaraki Prefecture
Japanese footballers
J1 League players
J2 League players
J3 League players
Japan Football League players
Kashima Antlers players
Fagiano Okayama players
AC Nagano Parceiro players
Iwate Grulla Morioka players
Association football midfielders